In public transport, a request stop, flag stop, or whistle stop is a stop or station at which buses or trains, respectively, stop only on request; that is, only if there are passengers or freight to be picked up or dropped off. In this way, stops with low passenger counts can be incorporated into a route without introducing unnecessary delay. Vehicles may also save fuel by continuing through a station when there is no need to stop.

There may not always be significant savings on time if there is no one to pick up because vehicles going past a request stop may need to slow down enough to be able to stop if there are passengers waiting. Request stops may also introduce extra travel time variability and increase the need for schedule padding.

The appearance of request stops varies greatly. Many are clearly signed, but many others rely on local knowledge.

Implementations
The methods by which transit vehicles are notified that there are passengers waiting to be picked up at a request stop vary by transit system and by route.

Local transport

Many local bus systems operate most of their stops as request stops. Buses do not service stops unless there is an awaiting passenger or an onboard passenger utilizes an electric bell to signal a stop (generally by pulling a cord, or pushing a button or yellow signaling strip). Stops that are served on every trip are often called stations and placed at the terminus of a route. Such stops are often also used as timing points.  

However, some systems use this term to distinguish between marked stops that must be hailed (as if hailing a taxicab) and marked stops where the driver will stop for any awaiting passengers (as above).  This practice was common on certain Transport for London routes until 2008, with different signs distinguishing between the two sorts of stops.

Still other systems may use the term "request stop" to refer to a servicing a location other than a marked bus stop. This sort of service can be found on hail and ride routes, designated portions of routes, or special late-night service. In hail and ride operations, there are few or no marked stops and passengers can request the bus be stopped at any point where the driver can safely and reasonably do so. This is common in some cities, such as Tulsa, Oklahoma, United States, where bus stops were infrequently signed before 2019. Some services operate in this way only late at night, allowing for drop-off between marked stops, thereby decreasing walking time for safety and convenience.  Examples include Winnipeg Transit and New York City MTA Bus (known as Late-night Request-A-Stop).

Long-distance transport

In long-distance transport, transit vehicles, such as passenger trains or buses operating on motorways, usually operate at higher speeds than local transport. This means that stopping is more troublesome (and more worth avoiding) and that it may be very difficult to see a passenger in time to stop for them. This difference often results in more complicated ways of signalling a stop to the vehicle.

Some services, like Amtrak, require that a ticket be purchased in advance, specifying a specific origin and destination. Since the train's crew know what tickets were sold, they also know where people are coming from and going to, and they simply stop only at those stations required by the tickets. Services that lack advanced ticketing, or that sell tickets for a range of destinations or travel times, require ways of knowing whether or not someone is waiting at a station or platform. These may range from a passenger speaking to a dispatcher on a phone located at a station or to a station employee to simply pressing a button to activate a signal such as a flashing light somewhere before the station that the driver can see in time to slow down safely.

In the United Kingdom, there exist approximately 150 railway request stops. When leaving from a request stop, the passenger has to signal the train driver by hand signal. When planning to disembark at a request stop, the passenger needs to inform the train conductor in advance.

Ferries
 
Along some ferry routes in the fjords in Norway, some stops are equipped with a light that embarking passengers must switch on in order for the ferry to include the stop and pick them up. The system is known under the name signalanløp. Similar to Norway, in Sweden commuter ferries are requested to stop by a semaphore signal. The many islands of the Stockholm archipelago are an example of this.

See also 
 Halt
 Hail and ride

References

External links

Railway stations
Bus terminology
Stations, terminals and stops
Scheduling (transportation)